Joler Gaan is an independent folk band from Dhaka, Bangladesh. It was established in 2006.

Name
The term "Joler Gaan" consists of two Bengali words which reflect ideals of the band. "Jol" means water and "Gaan" means music or song in Bengali. Together they mean "Music of Water".

Style
The lyrics are based on human stories. Few lyrics are collected from various sources. Some songs are especially written. Joler Gaan makes new instruments and sometimes customizes foreign ones. The instruments of Joler Gaan are usually portable, and do not require electric wires and jacks.

Discography
 Otol Joler Gaan (12 April 2013)
 Patalpurer Gaan (1 June 2014)
 Noyon Joler Gaan (27 October 2019)

Members

Current members
 Rahul Anand – lyricist, composer,  vocalist, flutes, clarinet and mandola
 Mollik Oishorjo - vocalist, harmonium
 Gopi Devnath – violin
 Rana sarwar  – cajon, percussion, guitar, piano
 ABS Xem – vocalist, guitar
 Md Masum  – dhol, percussion
 Dip Roy  – double bass, pagli, podma totaban
 DH Shuvo - sound engineer

Past members
 Kanak Adittya
 Shyamol Karmaker
 Saiful Jurnal
 Aseer Arman
 Sheuli Bhattacharjee
 Al Fahmi Kazi Bashar Kartik
 Parijat Moumon
 Sanjay Kumar Saha
 Shariful Islam
 Fazlul Kader Chowdhury Mithu

Notable performances
In 2006, the band participated in the World Sufi Festival, Glasgow, Scotland. Joler Gaan also performed around Scotland. They played mystical spiritual songs of Old Masters. Joler Gaan performed in the National Museum of Scotland in Edinburgh.

References

External links
 

Musical groups established in 2006
Bangladeshi folk rock groups
Bangladeshi indie folk groups